Loon Lake is a First Nations settlement within the Loon Lake 235 Indian reserve in northern Alberta, Canada. It is located on the eastern shore of the lake, west of Highway 88.

The settlement is located in census division No. 17 and in the federal riding of Fort McMurray-Athabasca. The settlement and the Indian reserve are part of the Loon River First Nation.

See also 
List of communities in Alberta

Localities on Indian reserves in Alberta